Thayer is a city in Union County, Iowa, United States. The population was 51 at the time of the 2020 census.

Geography
Thayer is located at 41°1'45" North, 94°2'59" West (41.029242, -94.049856).

Demographics

2010 census
As of the census of 2010, there were 59 people, 24 households, and 15 families residing in the city. The racial makeup of the city was 100.0% White.

There were 24 households, of which 37.5% had children under the age of 18 living with them, 37.5% were married couples living together, 4.2% had a female householder with no husband present, 20.8% had a male householder with no wife present, and 37.5% were non-families. 33.3% of all households were made up of individuals, and 4.2% had someone living alone who was 65 years of age or older. The average household size was 2.46 and the average family size was 3.00.

The median age in the city was 36.5 years. 25.4% of residents were under the age of 18; 10.3% were between the ages of 18 and 24; 37.3% were from 25 to 44; 18.7% were from 45 to 64; and 8.5% were 65 years of age or older. The gender makeup of the city was 57.6% male and 42.4% female.

2000 census
As of the census of 2000, there were 66 people, 26 households, and 15 families residing in the city. The racial makeup of the city was 96.97% White and 3.03% Native American.

There were 26 households, out of which 26.9% had children under the age of 18 living with them, 46.2% were married couples living together, none had a female householder with no husband present, and 38.5% were non-families. 26.9% of all households were made up of individuals, and 15.4% had someone living alone who was 65 years of age or older. The average household size was 2.54 and the average family size was 3.06.

In the city, the population was spread out, with 25.8% under the age of 18, 12.1% from 18 to 24, 33.3% from 25 to 44, 18.2% from 45 to 64, and 10.6% who were 65 years of age or older. The median age was 33 years. For every 100 females, there were 112.9 males. For every 100 females age 18 and over, there were 104.2 males.

The median income for a household in the city was $31,250, and the median income for a family was $38,750. Males had a median income of $21,667 versus $12,500 for females. The per capita income for the city was $13,705. 6.3% of the population but no families were below the poverty line. Out of the total population, none of those under the age of 18 and 25.0% of those 65 and older were living below the poverty line.

See also
 Mount Pisgah (Iowa)
 Mormon Trail

References

Cities in Union County, Iowa
Cities in Iowa